The Bay of Skaill (from Old Norse Bugr Skála) is a small bay on the west coast of the Orkney Mainland, Scotland.

Visitor attractions
Bay of Skaill is the location of the famous Neolithic settlement, Skara Brae, and a large residence, Skaill House, the property of the laird on whose estate Skara Brae was discovered. Skaill House has connections with Captain James Cook.

Skaill Viking hoard
In March 1858, a boy named David Linklater was digging at Muckle Brae, near the Sandwick parish church, when he came across a few pieces of silver lying in the earth. Astounded by the find, Linklater was soon joined by a number of folk. Together they unearthed over one hundred items. This hoard is the largest Viking treasure trove found so far in Scotland.

References

Sites of Special Scientific Interest in Orkney
Skaill
1858 archaeological discoveries